Siva Umapathy (born 1959) is the current Director of the Indian Institute of Science Education and Research (IISER) Bhopal. He is an Indian laser spectroscopist and was the Chair of the Department of Inorganic and Physical Chemistry and a Professor of Instrumentation and Applied Physics at the Indian Institute of Science. He is known for his studies of molecular dynamics using Raman spectroscopy and is a fellow of the Royal Society of Chemistry and an elected fellow of the Indian Academy of Sciences and also The National Academy of Science of India, The Council of Scientific and Industrial Research, the apex agency of the Government of India for scientific research, awarded him the Shanti Swarup Bhatnagar Prize for Science and Technology, one of the highest Indian science awards, in 2004, for his contributions to chemical sciences.

Biography 
Umapathy, born on 10 June 1959 in Tanjavur in the south Indian state of Tamil Nadu, graduated in chemistry from Kongunadu Arts and Science College of the University of Madras and joined PSG College of Technology from where he passed MSc in applied science in 1981. Subsequently, he moved to New Zealand for his doctoral studies and secured a PhD in physical chemistry from the University of Otago. Obtaining a research fellowship from Science and Engineering Research Board, he did his post-doctoral studies at Rutherford Appleton Laboratory and University of York. On his return to India, he joined the Indian Institute of Science where he is a professor of the Department of Instrumentation and Applied Physics and the chair of the Department of Inorganic and Physical Chemistry. He heads Laser Spectroscopy Group at IISc where he hosts a number of doctoral and post-doctoral scholars. He has also served as a visiting faculty or fellow at various institutions such as Kanagawa Academy of Science and Technology, University of Groningen, Institute of Molecular Science, University of Tokyo, Imperial College of Science and Technology and University of Nottingham.

Legacy 
Umapathy's researches were centered on Laser spectroscopy and he has carried out extensive work on molecular dynamics using Raman spectroscopy. His group also utilizes other spectroscopic techniques like infra red and is involved in the examination of the molecular structure of cells and tissues. Using Raman spectroscopic techniques, he has developed a method to identify biomarkers in cells which is estimated to assist in early cancer detection. He has published several peer-reviewed articles; ResearchGate, an online repository of science articles, has listed 164 of them.

Awards and honors 
Umapathy, holder of Swarna Jayanthi Fellowship (2000) and the J. C. Bose National Fellowship of the Department of Science and Technology from 2010 to 2020, received the Young Investigator Award for the ICORS Conference at the University of South Carolina in 1989 and Sir C. V. Raman Young Scientist Award of the Government of Karnataka in 2003. The Council of Scientific and Industrial Research awarded him the Shanti Swarup Bhatnagar Prize, one of the highest Indian science awards, in 2004. The same year, he received the Bronze Medal Medal of the Chemical Research Society of India. He is also a recipient of the Raman-Mishishuma Award of the India-Japan Science Promotion Council which he received in 2012. He is a fellow of the Royal Society of Chemistry and an elected fellow by the Indian Academy of Sciences in 2003 He has delivered several award orations including the Subbarao Memorial Lecture of Osmania University (1993) and many invited and plenary lectures.

References

External links 
 
 

Recipients of the Shanti Swarup Bhatnagar Award in Chemical Science
1959 births
Indian scientific authors
Fellows of the Indian Academy of Sciences
Living people
Tamil scientists
Fellows of the Royal Society of Chemistry
University of Madras alumni
University of Otago alumni
Alumni of the University of York
Academic staff of the Indian Institute of Science
Academic staff of the University of Groningen
Academics of the University of Nottingham
Academic staff of the University of Tokyo
Indian Tamil academics
People from Thanjavur district